The women's 75 kilograms weightlifting event at the 2012 Summer Olympics in London, United Kingdom, took place at ExCeL London on 3 August 2012.

Summary
Total score was the sum of the lifter's best result in each of the snatch and the clean and jerk, with three lifts allowed for each lift.  In case of a tie, the lighter lifter won; if still tied, the lifter who took the fewest attempts to achieve the total score won.  Lifters without a valid snatch score did not perform the clean and jerk.

The results of this event were significantly altered following the 2016 retesting of the original in-competition samples for banned substances.

In June 2016, following the Russian doping scandal, it was announced by the IWF that retests of samples taken from the 2012 Olympics indicated that gold medalist Svetlana Podobedova had tested positive for prohibited substances, namely Stanazolol. A few weeks later, the IWF reported the second wave of re-testing indicated both silver medalist Natalya Zabolotnaya and bronze medalist Iryna Kulesha had tested positive for prohibited anabolic agents.

On 26 October 2016, Podobedova was disqualified, and both Zabolotnaya and Kulesha were disqualified on 21 November 2016.

Thus, Lydia Valentín of Spain, who had originally finished fourth, was declared the 2012 Olympic champion.

Schedule
All times are British Summer Time (UTC+01:00)

Records

 Cao Lei's Olympic records were rescinded in 2017.

Results

New records

References

External links 
Results 

Weightlifting at the 2012 Summer Olympics
Olymp
Women's events at the 2012 Summer Olympics